Clark/Division is an "L" station on the CTA's Red Line. It is a subway station with one island platform, located at 1200 North Clark Street, in the Near North Side neighborhood of Chicago, between the Gold Coast and Old Town. Much of Chicago's North Loop nightlife, including the Rush Street district and many bars and nightclubs are located close to the station.

History

Structure
Clark/Division station is in the State Street subway, which opened on October 17, 1943.

Platform
Clark/Division is the only station in the State Street Subway north of the loop to have an island platform; all of the other stations in the subway north of the loop use side platforms.

Renovation
On September 10, 2012, a renovation project began at the station and ended on September 29, 2015. The renovation project made the station ADA accessible and provided new art features, bike racks, new signage, granite floors and stairs. The new LaSalle mezzanine and entrances opened at 5:00 a.m. on June 30, 2014. The station remained open during the project. The renovation has a projected cost of $50 million. The renovation of the Clark mezzanine and entrances was completed on  September 29, 2015.

Bus connections
CTA
  22 Clark (Owl Service) 
  36 Broadway 
  70 Division

Notes and references

Notes

References

External links 

 Clark/Division Station Page at Chicago-'L'.org
 Train schedule (PDF) at CTA official site
Clark/Division Station Page CTA official site
Clark Street entrance from Google Maps Street View

CTA Red Line stations
Railway stations in the United States opened in 1943